Coração de Maria is a municipality in the state of Bahia in the North-East region of Brazil.

References

External links
http://www.coracaodemaria.ba.gov.br

Municipalities in Bahia